Cham Kabud (also Romanized as Cham Kabūd and Cham-e Kabūd; also known as Chamkabood Bala, Cham Kabūd-e Pā'īn, and Cham Kabūd-e-Pā’īn) is a village in Cham Kabud Rural District, Sarab Bagh District, Abdanan County, Ilam Province, Iran. At the 2006 census, its population was 1,054, in 213 families. The village is populated by Kurds.

References 

Populated places in Abdanan County
Kurdish settlements in Ilam Province